Ján Kozák may refer to:
Ján Kozák (footballer born 1954)
Ján Kozák (footballer born 1980)
Jan Kozák (basketball player, 1929 – 2016)